The 1904 Wisconsin gubernatorial election was held on November 8, 1904.

Incumbent Republican Governor Robert M. La Follette defeated Democratic nominee George Wilbur Peck and Social-Democratic nominee William A. Arnold with 50.55% of the vote.

General election

Candidates
Major party candidates
George Wilbur Peck, Democratic, former Governor
Robert M. La Follette, Republican, incumbent Governor

Other candidates
Edward Scofield, National Republican, former Governor (replacing Samuel A. Cook)
William H. Clark, Prohibition, Prohibition nominee for Wisconsin's 6th congressional district in 1898
William A. Arnold, Socialist (Social-Democratic Party of Wisconsin), printer
Charles M. Minkley, Socialist Labor, Socialist Labor nominee for Wisconsin's 5th congressional district in 1902

Results

References

Bibliography
 
 
 

1904
Wisconsin
Gubernatorial